Sidney Weintraub is the name of:

 Sidney Weintraub (economist born 1914) (1914–1983)
 Sidney Weintraub (economist born 1922) (1922–2014)

See also

 Sy Weintraub (1923–2000), best known for his Tarzan films and television episodes